Christopher Lukas (born March 6, 1935) is an American writer, stage actor, television producer and director who, for the past fifty-five years, has worked primarily for public television. From 1963 to 1971 he produced for WNET in New York City, making over 200 hours of programming for the educational station. In 1969 he was promoted to director of programming.

His birth, early years, and education
Christopher "Kit" Lukas was born to Elizabeth and Edwin Lukas in New York. His mother was an actress, and his uncle Paul Lukas was an Academy Award–winning actor. His father was a lawyer who headed up the civil rights division of the American Jewish Committee, and made many efforts to promote equality between the races in America. After his mother's death by suicide and his father's illness after her death, he was at the age of six enrolled in the coeducational Putney School boarding school in Vermont. He graduated with high honors from Swarthmore College and married Susan Ries—author and psychotherapist—in 1962. She died in 2008. His older brother was J. Anthony Lukas, Pulitzer Prize-winning journalist and writer.

Career

Television
After his work with WNET in NY, Lukas moved into the freelance world in 1971, working for public TV stations in San Francisco and Chicago, among others. His works for PBS include: The Mystery of Love, The World of Abnormal Psychology, Music From Aspen, Whose Death is It, Anyway?, Moyers: Report from Philadelphia, The Do It Yourself Messiah, and The Talking Walls of Pompeii.[[Pete Seeger's Legacy}} aired in over 150 cities in 2019.  His non-television works include videos for non-profit organizations.

Acting
While continuing to work in video and television, Lukas returned in 2002 to the field of acting. He has appeared off-Broadway and in regional theaters, playing a wide variety of roles in plays by Shakespeare, Dostoyevsky, Chekhov, and Stoppard.

Writing
As a writer of books, he has concentrated on end-of-life matters. These works include:
 Blue Genes: A Memoir of Loss & Survival (Doubleday) 2008.
 Silent Grief: Living in the Wake of Suicide (Scribners, Bantam Books) 1987. Also published in Brazil, Russia, and China.
 Staying in Charge: Practical Plans for the End of Your Life (John Wiley & Son) 2004.
 The First Year: Prostate Cancer (Marlowe Books.) 2005.
 Shrink Rap: a guide to psychotherapy by a frequent flier''
He has also written and self-published a biography of his father and of his late wife. As of 2020 he has written over 75 short stories. A book containing 25 of them (CARRYING A TORCH) was published in the spring of 2021 by Stephen F. Austin State University Press.

References

 https://web.archive.org/web/20090307010001/http://www.thirteen.org/soul/about-soul/host-ellis-haizlip-andsoul-history
 http://www.wnyc.org/shows/lopate/episodes/2008/10/15/segments/112548
 Random House web site (Randomhouse.com) where Lukas's latest book appears.

Television producers from New York (state)
American psychology writers
American male non-fiction writers
1935 births
People from White Plains, New York
American male stage actors
Living people
Swarthmore College alumni